Kristen Borgar Dahler Eik-Nes (28 September 1922 – 23 February 1992) was a Norwegian medical scientist, known for his contributions to androgen research.

He was born at the village of Sparbu (now Steinkjer) in Nord-Trøndelag, Norway. He was the son of Nina Eik-Nes and Knut Eik-Nes. As a young boy he suffered from serious illness which delayed his education. During the German occupation of Norway he was a member of Milorg, and eventually a regional Milorg leader. He graduated from the medical program at the University of Oslo in  1951.

He was appointed professor at the University of Utah in Salt Lake City from 1958, and later at the University of Southern California in Los Angeles. From 1972 he was professor in biophysics at the Norwegian Institute of Technology in Trondheim. His hobbies included climbing and motor sport, and he was a passionate art collector. Following his death, his art collection was bequeathed to Trondhjems Kunstforening.

References

1922 births
1992 deaths
People from Steinkjer
Norwegian resistance members
University of Southern California faculty
University of Oslo alumni
University of Utah faculty
Academic staff of the Norwegian Institute of Technology
20th-century Norwegian scientists
20th-century Norwegian educators
Norwegian expatriates in the United States